Geranium renardii is a species of hardy flowering herbaceous perennial plant in the genus Geranium, in the family Geraniaceae. It is native to the Caucasus region between Europe and Asia. This plant has gained the Royal Horticultural Society's Award of Garden Merit. 
It grows well in sunny positions or shade both and well drained soils. 

The Latin specific epithet renardii honours the Russian naturalist Charles Claude Renard (1809-1886).

References

renardii